Poot Mae Nam Khong (literally The Spirit of Mekong River ) is a Thai Horror Superstition Lakorn, remade from 1990 lakorn of the same name. The lakorn starring by Weir Sukollawat and Jui Warattaya as the Main roles and Morakot Aimee Kittisara as the ghost.

Summary 
Every river has its own soul as vengeance never dies.

Dr. Akkanee and his crew travels to a village that is old fashion and superstitious to study the paranormal and that prove that it is not true. In the village he meets and falls for a girl named Bunpaun. He is curious about her since he often dreams about her before coming to the village. The village is close to the Mekong river, which the villagers believe house spirits and deities. This is true as a spirit of a vengeful princess resides underneath the river waiting for her betrothal, which is the reincarnated Dr. Akkanee.

In a previous life, Dr. Akkanee traveled from his land to marry the princess. The princess is taken with him when they first meet and immediately falls in love with him. Dr. Akkanee tells her that he wants to become a monk for a short while to dedicate his life to prayer and contemplation. The princess compromises and agrees to postpone the wedding. One day she goes to his room to bring him snacks and catches him with her younger sister, who she is very close too and the reincarnated Bunpaun, in an innocent yet intimate moment. It was obvious that the two were seeing each other behind her back. In rage, princess cursed them both and vows revenge for their betrayal. The hatred she had for the two caused her to lose her beauty and become a vicious spirit that plagues the village.

In the present time, Bunpaun finds an enormous egg at the bank of Mekong river and is compelled to eat. When she ate it, it turned her into a vassal, possessed by the princess now queen (or the Mother) of Mekong river who had long lusted for revenge. After the possession, Bunpaun disappeared from the village. When she returned, carrying the dreadful spirit inside her, the evil queen began killing local young girls one by one in order sustain her power. No exorcist got rid of her, no technology destroyed her, only the true love of Bunpaun and Dr. Ake was able to break into her vengeful heart......

Cast
 1992
Sattawat Doonwichit as Dr. Akkanee
Ratchaneekorn Phanmanee as Buapun
Angkana Timdee as Jaomae Torhoog
Thanin Thapmongkol as Dr. Uenngen
Saowaluck Siriaran as Tongmee
Somnapha Kasemsuwan as Jaomae Komedum
Chumphorn Thepphithak as Naanlah
Krung Srivilai as Joom
Arpaporn Kornthip as Bunruean
Sutee Siricharoen as Chao Worawong
Poonsawat Themakorn as Taochianglah
Jaran Petcharoen as Tayoi
Damp Duskorn as Kumnunleng
Thammasuk Suriyon as Kongta
Joomjim Khemlek as Tangim
Tuanthon Kamsri as Junti
Ampol Suansuk as Noo
Palm Rattanakul as Kumpoon
Yollada Ronghanam as Nangkumpang
Khaosai Galaxy as Tidden
Panom Nopporn as Samai Ornsa
 2008
Sukollawat Kanarot as Dr. Akkanee
Warattaya Nilkuha as Buapun
Morakot Kittisara as Jaomae Torhoog
Puchisa Thanapat as Jao Worawong
Usanee Wattana as Jaomae Komedum
Apichart Wongkawee as Dr. Uenngen
Sicha Sritongsuk as Maisee
Tongkao Pattarachokchai as Naanlah
Chusri Chernyim as Samai Ornsa
Nukkid Boonthong as Lungjundee
Ram Woratham as Taochianglah
Pongprayun Ratchaaphai as Joom
Rachit Chumuang as Noo
Prasong Saepaisarn as Kongta
Napaparin Phatarayukawat as Tangim
Tharin Isarangkul Na Ayudhaya as Kumpoon
Pratamaporn Rattanapakdee as Tongmee
Kitsadee Phuangprayong as Tidkane
Phutharit Prombandal as Praya Nongharnluarng
Parisa Tuntanavivat as Wianlae
Khwanruedi Klomklom as Bunruean
Klot Atthaseri as Kumnanleng
 2022
 Main
Warit Sirisantana as Khun Saeng Muang (Nobles of Wiang Ya Nong) / Dr. Akkanee (The son of Dr. Prawet)
Eisaya Hosuwan as Jaonang Kaew Baw Thong (Princess Wiangya Nong) / Buapun (Boonruen's daughter) 
Preeyakarn Jaikanta as Jaomae Torhoog (Princess Wiangya Nong) / Jaomae Torhoog (Poot Mae Nam Khong)   
Chanatip Phothongka as Phaya-Lue (I serve Sri Usa) / Thid-Ken (Thonmee fan has) 
Saranya Jumpatip as Kam-La (I'm a servant of Princess Kaew Buathong.) / Thonmee (Bua Pan's friend)

 Supporting
Paweena Charivsakul as Sri-Usa (Jaonang Kaew Baw Thong's mother) / Boonruen (Bua Pan's mother)
Tee Doksadao as Jan Dee (Followers of Dr. Akanee) 
Jakkabum Chernyim as Samai Aonsa (Nang Khoi villagers/The caretaker of the doctor at the health station)
Anna Chuancheun as Kamnan-Leng (Wian-Le 's father) 
Prasat Thong-Aram as Chang-La (Nang Khoi villagers)
Chanidapa Pongsilpipat as Wian-Le (Lun) (Kamnan Leng's daughter)
Nuttanee Sittisamarn as Khiao-Khom (Servant of Lady Weo Huk / Goddess Weo Huk)
Jakkrit Ammarat as Jao Kam Fah (Jaonang Kaew Baw Thong's father) / Luang Por Jum (Phra Thu Dong)
Wongwachira Petchkeaw as Phaya-Jan (Servant of Lady Weo Huk / Goddess Weo Huk)
Chattarika Sittiprom as Jaosai Dara (Princess Muang Sri Pandon) / Jaonang Komkam (Chao Worawong's sister)
Khunkanich Koomkrong as Kampeang (Nang Khoi villagers/The medium of Princess Kaew Phimpha of Nang Khoi Village)   
Passakorn Krausopon as Arjhan Sao (Sorcerer from the temple)
Narissan Lokavit as Jao Yod Seuk (Prince Muang Sri Pandon) / Jao Worawong (Brother of Chao Nang Khom Kham)
Kittitat Pradab as Phia-Kamsing (Nobles of Wiang Ya Nong) / Dr. Aun-Ngein (A friend of Dr. Akanee/Wife of Chao Nang Khom Kham) 

 Guest Appearances  
Athiwat Sanitwong Na Ayutthaya as Jao Mung Mueang (King Wiang Ya Nong / Jaonang Torhoog's father)
Prangned Thajai as Jaonang Kaewpimpha (The noble deity of Nang Khoi Village)
Nichaphat Rodsawed as Nang (Uncle Am's daughter/Nang Khoi villagers) 
Suttasitt Pottasak as Dr. Prawet (Dr. Akkanee's father) 
Rattikan Kaewkunya as Eib (Nang Khoi villagers)
Ranee Phomyong as Pao (Nang Khoi villagers)
Napong Sorin as Rak (Kannan-Leng Henchman)
Chanachai Saijanhom as Yom (Kannan-Leng Henchman)
Pattanaset Chiratharn as Doctor Lecturer
Jatuporn Lakharn as Grandfather's ghost
Jirapat Phanngoen as Jao Mahesak (protect the land)
Boonsong Khiedthad as Nobles of Wiang Ya Nong
Ronnakorn Sanitpraphasorn as Ghost of the nobles of Wiang Ya Nong
Honey Saeng Saeng as Ghost of the nobles of Wiang Ya Nong
Yanavee Guptavetin as Mother boy
 as Pai (Nang Khoi villagers)
 as Sang (Nang Khoi villagers)
 as Yoi (Nang Khoi villagers)
 as Am (Nang's father)
 as Luang Poo Khaw (Phra Thueng)
 as Jandee (young)
 as Khung-In (Nobles of Wiang Ya Nong) 
 as Wang (a liquor store seller in Nang Khoi Village) 
 as Phi Mahesak (protect the land) 
 as Kraisorn (servant of Chao Worawong) 
 as Fueng (servant of Chao Soi Dara) / Fong (servant of Chao Nang Khom Kham house)
 as Pang (Nang Khoi villagers)
 as Kam Fah (Nang Khoi villagers)
 as Buapun (chird)
 as Thid-Ken (chird) 
 as Thonmee (chird)

Reception
Poot Mae Nam Khong was well-received as a result of the number of satisfied viewers despite it disappointing some. The Lakorn became one of Rating hits for Ch7 during October 6–12 (refer to its second week of airing). The lakorn received a 13 rating from 6.73 million people watching ranked number #3 behind another 2 lakorn starring Pancake.

Now, the Lakorn ranked as one of Ch7’s hit makers for the second half of the year along with Silamanee and Muay Inter. It is reported that after the lakorn, the main actress, Jui Warattaya, become popular again after being absent from the big screen for long time.

References

External links 
Website
In Iheart Lakorn

Channel 7 (Thailand) original programming
Thai television soap operas
2000s Thai television series
2008 Thai television series debuts
2008 Thai television series endings